Chiang Mai International Airport  is an international airport serving Chiang Mai, the capital city of Chiang Mai Province in Thailand.  It is a major gateway that links Northern Thailand to the rest of the region, and currently the fourth-busiest airport in the country. The Airports of Thailand manages the airport.

History

The airport was established in 1921 as Suthep Airport.

As a result of the temporary closure of Suvarnabhumi Airport in 2008 due to the protests, Chiang Mai became the alternative stop-over for China Airlines' Taipei-Europe flights and for Swiss International Air Lines' Singapore-Zurich flights in the interim. On 24 January 2011, the airport became a secondary hub for Thai AirAsia. The China Airlines flights are now regular flights.

Upgrades in 2014 included expanding the apron for larger planes, extending operating hours to 24/7 (effective April 2014), and enlarging the international arrival hall and domestic departure hall.

The Airports of Thailand expanded the terminal with upgrades in 2014 including expansion of the apron for larger planes, extending operating hours to 24/7 (effective April 2014), and enlarging the international arrival hall and domestic departure hall. As of 2018, 31 airlines operated at CNX, serving 11 million passengers, 78,210 flights and 14,612 tonnes of cargo.

Facilities
There are two terminals, one for domestic passengers and the other for international flights.

Airlines and destinations

Statistics

Busiest international routes 2019

Busiest domestic routes 2019

References

External links
 
 Chiang Mai International Airport, official site
 Chiang Mai Airport Guide
 
 

Airports established in 1921
Airports in Thailand
Buildings and structures in Chiang Mai
1920s in Chiang Mai